Carmine Biagio Gatti (born February 10, 1988 in Avellino) is an Italian professional football player currently playing for Lega Pro Seconda Divisione team V.F. Colligiana on loan from S.S.C. Napoli.

See also
Football in Italy
List of football clubs in Italy

References

External links
 

1988 births
Living people
Italian footballers
F.C. Matera players
Parma Calcio 1913 players
A.S.D. Olimpia Colligiana players
Association football goalkeepers